Afak Chabab Relizane is a women's professional football club based in Relizane, Algeria. The club is playing in the Algerian Women's Championship, the top division in the Algerian female football league system.

History
Afak Relizane was founded in 1995 to encourage the practice of sports by young people from Relizane during the Algerian Civil War. The club is one of the most successful in Algerian women's football clubs.

In 2021, the team participated in the first edition of the African Champions League; they finished in second place in the 2021 CAF CL - UNAF zone qualifiers. In August 2022, Afak Relizane became the first women's Algerian club to be professional, this statue was done by the Confederation of African Football (CAF).

Players

Current squad

Notable players

Coaching staff

Current coaching staff

Manager history

Presidents

Honours

National titles
Algerian Women's Championship
Winners (11): 2010, 2011, 2012, 2013, 2014, 2015, 2016, 2017, 2021, 2022, 2023
Runners-up (7): 2000, 2002, 2003, 2004, 2008, 2009, 2019

Algerian Women's Cup
Winners (6): 2010, 2011, 2012, 2013, 2014, 2016
Runners-up (2): 2008, 2009

Algerian Women's Super Cup
Runners-up (1): 2016

Regional titles
Maghreb Women's Club Tournament
Winners (2): 2010, 2012
Runners-up (1): 2011

Performance in CAF competitions
CAF Women's Champions League: 2 appearances
2021 – UNAF qualifiers round
2022 – UNAF qualifiers round

References

Women's football clubs in Algeria
Association football clubs established in 1995
1995 establishments in Algeria